Carmeuse is a Belgian mining company which produces lime and limestone. The Carmeuse Group has production facilities in Europe, North America and Africa. Its head office is located in Louvain-la-Neuve and the company Chief Executive Officer is Rodolphe Collinet.

History
The company was founded in 1860 in the city of Liège. Over the years the company expanded across Western Europe into Italy, France and the Netherlands, Central Europe and Eastern Europe  into Slovakia, the Czech Republic, Hungary, Romania, Bosnia and Turkey and North America into the United States and Canada and also in Africa and Asia.

Activity
Carmeuse has developed many applications for industrial uses (steel, non-ferrous, chemicals, paintings, paper, carpets), for the agro-food industry (human food and animal feed), for the building industry (plasters and mortars, aerated autoclave concrete, calcium silicate bricks) and for environment applications (water and sludge treatment, flue-gas desulfurization).

Results
Total consolidated group net turnover amounted to:
 850 million Euros in 2005
 940 million Euros in 2006.
 950 million Euros in 2007.
 1200 million Euros in 2008.
 944 million Euros in 2009.
 1100 million Euros in 2010.
 1129 million Euros in 2012.
 1142 million Euros in 2015.

News
October 2007 – In a friendly deal with its partner, the Carmeuse Group takes over the control of Ozture Kimtas in Turkey

October 2007 – Carmeuse has been selected as the winning bidder for Oglebay Norton

September 2016 – Carmeuse signs its entry into South East Asia

Sources

External links
 Carmeuse Group website

Mining companies of Belgium
Limestone industry
Companies established in 1860
Companies based in Walloon Brabant
Ottignies-Louvain-la-Neuve